Ostromir (Остромир in Russian; Christian name - Joseph) (died c. 1057) was a statesman, voivod and posadnik of Novgorod in 1054-1057 and probably for some decades previous.

Ostromir is known from the first Russian dated book, the Ostromir Gospels (or Ostromir Codex), which he commissioned from his scribe Gregory. The chronicles record that Ostromir was the father of Vyshata and the grandfather of Yan Vyshatich. The Ostromir Gospels names his wife as Theophana, viewed by Andrzej Poppe as a daughter of Anna Porphyrogeneta and Vladimir the Great. Another popular speculation posits Konstantin Dobrynich as the father of Ostromir. 

According to the First Sophia Chronicle, Ostromir died in 1056 during his military campaign against the Chudes. It is highly unlikely, however, since the afterword to the Ostromir Codex clearly states that he was still alive in 1057.

Notes 

11th-century Rus' people
Posadniks of Novgorod
1057 deaths
Year of birth unknown